Victory Christian College is an independent Christian Prep to Year 12 school located in south-east Bendigo, Victoria, Australia. The college is a member of Independent Schools Victoria and Christian Schools Australia.

History
Victory Christian College was opened in 1995 as a ministry expression of Victory Church, an apostolic church in Bendigo. Different Christian denominations are represented in the staff and committee of management. In late 2009, the campus was relocated just over a kilometre down the road and expanded. The original site was redeveloped as a shopping centre.

See also 
 List of high schools in Victoria
 List of Non-Government Schools in Victoria, Australia

References

External links 
 Victory Christian College website
 Christian Education National website
 National Institute for Christian Education website

Private schools in Victoria (Australia)
Bendigo
Education in Bendigo